Michael McCullough (born March 21, 1945) is an American professional golfer who has played on the PGA Tour and Nationwide Tour, and currently plays on the Champions Tour.

McCullough was born in Coshocton, Ohio. He was introduced to golf by his grandfather. He turned pro in 1970 and joined the PGA Tour in 1972.

In 401 starts on the PGA Tour and 33 starts on the Nationwide Tour, McCullough never tasted victory. He did finish 2nd at the 1977 Tournament Players Championship. After reaching the age of 50 in March 1995, he joined the Senior PGA Tour (now called the Champions Tour). His first win on the Champions Tour – at the Mexico Senior Classic in 2001 – came just before his 56th birthday. He won the Emerald Coast Classic about a month later, and the Georgia-Pacific Grand Champions Championship in 2005.

McCullough was inducted into the Toledo Golf Hall of Fame in 1999, and is also a member of the Bowling Green Athletic Hall of Fame. He lives in Scottsdale, Arizona. He has three children: Jason, graduate of Brown University with a degree in Economics and later graduated from George Washington University with his J.D.; Mark, and Michelle, graduates of Trinity University both with degrees in History.

Amateur wins
1970 Ohio Amateur

Professional wins (5)

Other wins (2)
1974 Mini-Kemper Open
1977 Magnolia State Classic

Senior PGA Tour wins (2)

Senior PGA Tour playoff record (1–0)

Other senior wins (1)
2005 Georgia-Pacific Grand Champions Championship

Results in major championships

CUT = missed the half-way cut
WD = withdrew
"T" = tied

Results in The Players Championship

CUT = missed the halfway cut
WD = withdrew
"T" indicates a tie for a place

See also
1972 PGA Tour Qualifying School graduates
1985 PGA Tour Qualifying School graduates

References

External links

American male golfers
PGA Tour golfers
PGA Tour Champions golfers
Golfers from Scottsdale, Arizona
Golfers from Ohio
Bowling Green State University alumni
People from Coshocton, Ohio
1945 births
Living people